Martín de Padilla y Manrique, 1st Count of Santa Gadea, Adelantado of Castile (Calatañazor, present-day Castile and León, 1540 – El Puerto de Santa María, 1602), secretary of state and war of Philip II of Spain, was a Spanish Admiral during the Anglo–Spanish War (1585–1604), French Wars of Religion and the Eighty Years' War. His most notable naval engagements included the Spanish Armada, battle with the Counter Armada and the Battle of the Gulf of Almería (1591). Padilla commanded a squadron of galleys that sank four cargo vessels from the English Armada off Lisbon in 1589.

References

External links
Don Martín de Padilla y Manrique, Count of Santa Gadea

1540 births
1602 deaths
Counts of Spain
16th-century Spanish nobility
17th-century Spanish nobility
Spanish people of the Eighty Years' War